The "Argentine National Anthem"  is the national anthem of Argentina. Its lyrics were written by the Buenos Aires-born politician Vicente López y Planes and the music was composed by the Spanish musician Blas Parera. The work was adopted as the sole official song on 11 May 1813, three years after the May Revolution; 11 May is therefore now Anthem Day in Argentina.

Some first, quite different, anthems were composed from 1810; a version was then introduced in 1813, which was used throughout the 19th century. What is now officially codified as the state's national anthem is shorter than the original composition and comprises only the first and last verses and the chorus of the 1813 "Patriotic March", omitting much emotional text about the struggle for independence from Spain ("with strong arms they tear to pieces the arrogant Iberian lion").

Etymology
The third Argentine national anthem was originally named "", later renamed "", and then "". It has been called "Himno Nacional Argentino" since it was published with that name in 1847.

History

It had lyrics by Esteban de Luca and music by Blas Parera. This original composition made no reference to the name of Argentina (the country was not formally named "República Argentina" until 1826, although it was referred to as such) or an independentist will, and talked instead about Spain being conquered by France in the Peninsular War, the absolutist restoration begun by the Council of Regency, and the need to keep the republican freedoms achieved so far in the Americas: "Spain was victim / of the plotting Gaul / because to the tyrants / she bent her neck / If there treachery / has doomed a thousands cities / let sacred freedom and union reign here / Let the father to the sons / be able to say / enjoy rights / that I did not enjoy".

In mid-1812, the ruling triumvirate ordered the Buenos Aires Cabildo to commission a national anthem. Cayetano Rodríguez, a Franciscan friar, wrote a text that was approved on 4 August. The Catalan musician Blas Parera, music director of the local theater, set it to music and performed it for the first time with the orchestra he conducted on 1 November.

Less than a year later the Assembly of Year XIII estimated that the song was not effective enough to serve as a national anthem. On 6 March 1813 several poets were asked to submit lyrics. The poem by the lawyer Vicente López y Planes was unanimously considered the best. It was approved as the "sole national march" ("") on 11 May 1813. Parera was asked to compose a new musical setting around the same date. He must have finished the piece in a few days. Oral tradition has it that the premiere took place on 14 May 1813, at the home of the aristocrat Mariquita Sánchez de Thompson, but there is no documentary evidence of that. If this is true, then Parera, contrary to certain misconceptions, wrote quickly and under no visible coercion. The published song sheet is dated 14 May 1813. He again conducted the official premiere in the theater on 28 May, and was paid 200 pesos.

In the complete version of the Anthem of May (as was christened by López) it is noted that the political vision portrayed is not only Argentine, but Latin American. The lyrics are ardently pro-independence and anti-Spanish, as the country was at that time fighting for its independence from Spain.

The song became popular immediately. Within ten years documented performances took place throughout Argentina, and also in Chile, Peru, and Colombia until they had their own national anthems. Different versions emerged, making mass singing difficult; several reforms were then proposed. In 1860 Esnaola was commissioned to create an official version. He took the task to heart, making many changes to the music, including a slower tempo, a fuller texture, alterations to the melody, and enrichment of the harmony. In 1927 a committee produced a historicist version that undid several of Esnaola's changes, but introduced new problems in the sung line. After a heated public debate fueled by the newspaper , this version was rejected and, following the recommendations of a second committee, Esnaola's arrangement was officially reinstated. In 1944 it was confirmed as the official state anthem.

Throughout the 19th century the anthem was sung in its entirety. However, once harsh feelings against Spain had dissipated, and the country had become home to many Spanish immigrants, a modification was introduced by a decree of President Julio Argentino Roca on 30 March 1900:

Controversy
The song includes a line that has given rise to controversy: . The meaning reverses: "Buenos Aires opposes the front of the people of the union" to "Buenos Aires positions itself at the front ...". The original   has been interpreted as advancing part of the centralist views in Buenos Aires, but has also been considered a "tragical misprint". In many other lines the anthem goes beyond the Argentine theater of the Spanish American wars of independence and references events in Mexico, Central America, Northern South America, and Upper Peru. The growing ideas of independence are reflected in lines such as "On the surface of the earth rises a glorious new nation, her head is crowned with laurels, and a Lion lies defeated at her feet". This portrays not just Spanish absolutism, but Spain itself, as the enemy.

The words strongly attacking Spain were no longer sung.

Usage
Performance of the national anthem is mandatory during all official events, and Argentines in attendance are expected to stand up and sing it. Radio broadcasters voluntarily perform the anthem at midnight, while TV channels do so before closing down their daily broadcast. On national holidays, it is mandatory to perform the national anthem at midnight.

The national anthem is ruled in Argentine law by Decree 10302/1944.

The rock musician Charly García broke legal regulations dealing with the reproduction of the song when he included an idiosyncratic cover version in his 1990 album , stirring much controversy. In 1998 various Argentine artists reedited the anthem and other patriotic songs in the joint album . Other singers followed on their footsteps recreating the piece in their own ways.

A line from the original version of the national anthem was used as the Argentine title of the 1928 film known in English as The Charge of the Gauchos.

The national anthem appears at the beginning of the 1985 film The Official Story, an Academy Award winner.

Short instrumental versions

Due to the excessive length of the official version, in international events such as the Olympic Games, professional soccer games, and the Rugby World Cup, only the instrumental introduction (which lasts 1 minute 6 seconds) is played. Another variation is to play the instrumental introductory section followed by the last three lines (with the third line repeated), or the musical break that leads into the chorus, the chorus itself, and the coda. In profession soccer games, the final part of the anthem is played since 2019. Although traditional, these arrangements are not recognized by Argentine law.

Lyrics

Modern version
The following is the modern version, adopted in 1924, omitting the long anti-Spanish middle section.

Full lyrics

References

Notes

External links
Argentina: Himno Nacional Argentino - Audio of the national anthem of Argentina, with information and lyrics (archive link)
Argentine National Anthem MP3
Argentine National Anthem (vocal) MP3
Argentine National Anthem MP3
Argentine National Anthem with English subtitles on YouTube.
Listen in the Quechua language
Argentine National Anthem Upade Radio broadcast Television Versión.

National symbols of Argentina
Argentina
Spanish-language songs
1810s songs
National anthems
National anthem compositions in B-flat major